Siloam Township is one of fifteen townships in Surry County, North Carolina,  United States. The township had a population of 1,071 according to the 2000 census, making it the smallest township in Surry County by population.

Geographically, Siloam Township occupies  in southern Surry County, with its southern border consisting of the Yadkin River.  There are no incorporated municipalities within Siloam Township; however, there are several smaller, unincorporated communities, including the community of Siloam.

References

Townships in Surry County, North Carolina
Townships in North Carolina